David William Balza (born August 15, 1969) is an American college basketball coach for the Palm Beach Atlantic Sailfish and was the first head men's basketball coach in Florida Gulf Coast University history. He served from their inaugural season in 2002–03 through the 2010–11 season, after which he was fired. He was student manager for the 1988–89 Michigan Wolverines men's basketball team that won the 1989 NCAA Division I men's basketball tournament.

Head Coaching Record

References

1969 births
Living people
Basketball coaches from Michigan
Ashland Eagles men's basketball coaches
Cleveland State Vikings men's basketball coaches
Florida Gulf Coast Eagles men's basketball coaches
Saint Joseph's Pumas men's basketball coaches
University of Michigan alumni
Place of birth missing (living people)
People from South Haven, Michigan
Bethany Lutheran Vikings
Palm Beach Atlantic Sailfish